King's High School is a private, interdenominational Christian school, located in Shoreline, Washington, just north of Seattle. It is part of King's Schools.  It enrolls approximately 470 students in 9th through 12th grade.  King's High School also has elementary and middle schools on the same campus.

Academics

King's offers Advanced Placement courses in art, biology, calculus, chemistry, English language and literature, U.S. and European history, and Spanish.  In 2009, King's students took 97 AP examinations.

Ninety-eight percent of King's students go on to higher education.

Athletics

King's competes at the 1A classification level as part of the Washington Interscholastic Activities Association.  King's has won 51 state championships and 39 academic state championships in basketball, cross country, golf, soccer, track & field and volleyball.  Most recently, the Knights have won the 2018 boys' track state championship.

In 2005, Sports Illustrated named King's the top high school athletic program in Washington State.

The seven state championships won by the girls' cross country team (2001-2003, 2006-2009) are the most by any school in WIAA history.

Two-time LPGA tour winner Jimin Kang led the King's girls' golf team to the 1999 state title.

Alumni 
 Jimin Kang, LPGA golfer
 Corey Kispert (class of 2017), current basketball player for the Washington Wizards.

References

High schools in King County, Washington
Private high schools in Washington (state)
Shoreline, Washington
1950 establishments in Washington (state)
Educational institutions established in 1950